Carolyn Tomei (born 1936) is a Democratic politician from the US state of Oregon. She served in the Oregon House of Representatives for District 41, representing Milwaukie and parts of Southeast Portland, including Sellwood and Eastmoreland from 2001 to 2015.

Early life and career
Tomei was born in Charleston, West Virginia. She earned a bachelor's degree in psychology and a master's degree in social work from Portland State University.

Political career
Tomei served on the Milwaukie Planning Commission in the 1990s and was elected to the Milwaukie City Council in 1996. In 1998, she ran for mayor of Milwaukie, and won a three-person race by 2–1 margin over her closest competitor. Tomei was first elected mayor in a special election held March 10, 1998. The election was held following the recall of Mayor Craig Lomnicki. Tomei won the three-way race with 2,003 votes over Councilor Rob Kappa's 952 votes and former councilor Rick Farley's 819 votes. In the November, 1998 election, Tomei ran unopposed. In 2000, she ran for an open seat in the Oregon House of Representatives, previously held by Republican Jane Lokan. In the general election, Tomei defeated Republican Dick Jones. She was re-elected to the same seat six times.

In March 2014 she announced she would not run for another term.

Personal
Tomei is married to Gary Michael, and the couple have 17 children, step children, and foster children.

Beliefs
Raised Roman Catholic, Tomei later identified herself as a secular humanist.  In January, 2013, while leading the Oregon House in reciting the Pledge of Allegiance Tomei changed the words "one nation under God" to "one nation under love." In December, 2013, Tomei was endorsed by the Freethought Equality PAC because of her "commitment to promote a more secular government and a will to protect the rights of all people, including the now 20 percent of Americans that don't identify with any particular religion."

References

External links
 Legislative website
 Project VoteSmart biography

Members of the Oregon House of Representatives
Politicians from Charleston, West Virginia
People from Milwaukie, Oregon
Portland State University alumni
Living people
1936 births
American social workers
Mayors of places in Oregon
Oregon city council members
Women mayors of places in Oregon
21st-century American politicians
21st-century American women politicians
Women city councillors in Oregon